Abnody is an old and rare Russian male first name. The patronymics derived from this first name are "" (Abnodiyevich), "" (Abnodyevich; both masculine); and "" (Abnodiyevna), "" (Abnodyevna; both feminine).

References

Notes

Sources
Н. А. Петровский (N. A. Petrovsky). "Словарь русских личных имён" (Dictionary of Russian First Names). ООО Издательство "АСТ". Москва, 2005. 

Russian masculine given names